Johannes Franz Hartmann (11 January 1865 – 13 September 1936) was a German physicist and astronomer. In 1904, while studying the spectroscopy of Delta Orionis he noticed that most of the spectrum had a shift, except the calcium lines, which he interpreted as indicating the presence of interstellar medium.

He was the director of the La Plata Astronomical Observatory, Argentina, from November 1922 to May 1934, and was also known under the name Juan Hartmann. He oriented the work of the observatory towards astrophysics and discovered the three asteroids of the main-belt, 965 Angelica, 1029 La Plata and 1254 Erfordia at La Plata between 1921 and 1932.

His doctorate was from the University of Leipzig in 1891 on lunar eclipses.

The lunar crater Hartmann on the far side of the Moon was named in his honor. Note, however, that the asteroid 3341 Hartmann was named after William K. Hartmann and is unrelated to him.

See also 
 Hartman mask, a tool to help focusing telescope

References

External links 
  Lista de cientificos 
 Hartmann, Johannes Franz 

1865 births
1936 deaths
19th-century German astronomers
Discoverers of asteroids

20th-century German physicists
20th-century German astronomers
German expatriates in Argentina
19th-century German physicists